Mohamed Sami (born 26 August 1983), is an Egyptian director and writer. He is best known for the roles in the television serials, Detention Letter, Regatta and Tisbah ala Khair.

Personal life
He was born on 26 August 1983 in Cairo, Egypt. He had one sister, who passed away at the age of 25 due to cancer. In 2005, he graduated from Aspen University, Colorado in business and minored in filmmaking.

He is married to popular actress Mai Omar since 2010. The couple has two daughters, Taya and Celine.

Career
Initially he started career for the passion of art and photography. Then in 2008, he directed the gladiator-themed music video Enta Tani for Haifa Wehbe. After the video went viral, he directed video clips for Shereen and Tamer Hosny. With the guidance of Tamer Hosny, he directed his maiden television serial Adam in 2011. In 2012, he made film debut with Omar & Salma 3.

In 2020, he directed the popular Ramadan television serial The Prince. In the same year, he signed a three-year contract to create content for Synergy production company. In 2021, he directed the Ramadan drama Nasl al-Aghrab starring Ahmed al-Sakka and Amir Karara. He continued to direct Ramadan 2021 drama marathon with TV series Nasl Al-Agrab (The Descendants of the Strangers).

Filmography

References

External links
 

Living people
1983 births
Egyptian film directors
Egyptian film people